The 2010 InterLiga was the seventh and last edition of the tournament. It determined the last two Mexican berths in the 2010 Copa Libertadores.

Venues

Qualification
Qualification to this year's InterLiga remains the same. The qualified teams were the eight best-positioned teams in the 2009 Apertura general table who did not qualify for the 2010 Copa Libertadores directly (Morelia, San Luis, and Guadalajara) and did not qualify for the 2009–10 CONCACAF Champions League from the previous season (Toluca, Cruz Azul, Pachuca, and UNAM).

Group stage

Group A

Group B

Finals 

Kickoffs are given in UTC-6.

Goalscorers

4 goals
 Salvador Cabañas (América)
 Rodrigo Ruiz (Estudiantes Tecos)
2 goals
 Itamar (UANL)
 Fredy Bareiro (Estudiantes Tecos)
 Álvaro González (Puebla)
 Daniel Ludueña (Santos Laguna)
 Nicolás Olivera (Puebla)
 Carlos Ruiz (Puebla)

1 goal
 Rosinei (América)
 Alejandro Acosta (Puebla)
 Edgar Andrade (Chiapas)
 Daniel Arreola (Atlante)
 José Basanta (Monterrey)
 Mauro Cejas (Estudiantes Tecos)
 Enrique Esqueda (América)
 Juan Carlos García (Puebla)
 Alfredo González Tahuilán (UANL)
 Lucas Lobos (UANL)

1 goal (continued)
 Osvaldo Martínez (Monterrey)
 Daniel Montenegro (América)
 Ezequiel Orozco (Chiapas)
 Luis Ernesto Pérez (Monterrey)
 Ángel Reyna (América)
 Juan Pablo Rodríguez (Santos Laguna)
 Guillermo Rojas (Atlante)
 Rubens Sambueza (Estudiantes Tecos)
 Luis Alonso Sandoval (América)

See also
2010 Copa Libertadores
Primera División de México

References

External links 
Official site 

2009–10 in Mexican football
2010 domestic association football cups
2010